Rancho San Pascual also known as Rancho el Rincón de San Pascual was a   Mexican land grant in present-day Los Angeles County, California given to Juan Marine in 1834 by José Figueroa.   Rancho San Pascual land now includes the cities of Pasadena, South Pasadena, and portions of San Marino, and the unincorporated communities of Altadena and San Pasqual.

History
After the Mission San Gabriel Arcángel was secularized in 1834, the rancho was granted by Governor Figueroa to Juan Mariné, a retired artillery lieutenant. Juan Marine's wife Maria Antonia Sepulveda had died in 1831, and Marine married the widow Eulalia Pérez de Guillén Mariné.

Juan Marine died in 1838, and José Pérez and Enrique Sepúlveda were granted title to Rancho San Pascual by Mexican Governor  Alvarado in 1839.  Both built small adobe houses near the Arroyo Seco. Perez died in 1841 and Enrique Sepulveda died in 1843. Rancho San Pascual was once again abandoned. 

Manuel Garfias, a lieutenant in the Mexican Army, denounced the former grant and claimed the land for himself. Manuel Garfias was granted title to Rancho San Pasqual by Mexican Governor Micheltorena in 1843. Garfias served in Micheltorena's "Batalon Fijo de Californias" or the Fixed Battalion of California as an officer from 1842 to 1845. Garfias married Luisa Avila, the daughter of Francisco Avila and María Encarnación Sepúlveda Avila, the owners of Rancho Las Cienegas and the Avila Adobe.

With the cession of California to the United States following the Mexican–American War, the 1848 Treaty of Guadalupe Hidalgo provided that the land grants would be honored. As required by the Land Act of 1851, a claim for Rancho San Pascual to the Public Land Commission for 3 square leagues based on the Alvarado grant to Enrique Sepulveda and José Perez, was made by María Merced Lugo de Foster and María Antonia Perez June, but was rejected. Garfias received a US patent for  based on the Micheltorena grant.

Garfias sold portions of San Pascual to finance the building of an elaborate adobe manor was constructed along the east bank of the Arroyo Seco.  This expensive adobe was the new headquarters of Rancho San Pascual, but it caused Garfias to lose his land.  Benjamin Wilson acquired rest of the rancho from Garfias in 1858.

Wilson sold a half interest in Rancho San Pascual to John S. Griffin in 1860. Griffin sold portions of his share including to Dr. Benjamin S. Eaton, the father of Fred Eaton.  In 1873, Daniel M. Berry, a purchasing agent for the Indiana Colony of California, came to Rancho San Pascual.  Berry purchased a large portion of the property along the Arroyo Seco and on January 31, 1874 incorporated the Indiana Colony.

In 1872, George Stoneman bought  from Wilson.

Historic sites of the Rancho
 Adobe Flores built by José Pérez.  After his defeat at the Battle of La Mesa, Jose Maria Flores camped at Rancho San Pascual near the adobe.
 Governor Stoneman Adobe, Los Robles.

See also
 Eulalia Pérez de Guillén Mariné
 Ranchos of California
 List of Ranchos of California

References

External links
Map of old Spanish and Mexican ranchos in Los Angeles County

San Pascual
San Pascual
History of Pasadena, California
Altadena, California
Arroyo Seco (Los Angeles County)
San Marino, California
San Gabriel Valley
South Pasadena, California
1834 establishments in Alta California